Winterton is a small town situated on the banks of the Tugela River in the foothills of the Drakensberg mountains, KwaZulu-Natal, South Africa. It was founded in 1905 as Springfield when the Natal Government built a weir across the Little Tugela River. The town later changed its name to Winterton in honour the secretary for agriculture, HD Winter. Winterton is a small town with only a primary school. It is close to the Second Boer War battle sites of Battle of Vaal Krantz and Spioenkop.

The town is situated on the R74 between Bergville and the N3, as well as the R600 between Ladysmith and the Central Drakensberg.

Winterton also serves as an entry point to the Champagne Valley as well as the Cathedral area of the central Drakensberg, boasting well known mountain peaks such as Champagne Castle and Cathedral Peak respectively - these mountains are considered to be among the most spectacular sights in Southern Africa.

The town has also grown to become a popular tourist destinations, for South Africans and foreigners alike.

References

Populated places in the Okhahlamba Local Municipality